Krushuna is a village in Letnitsa Municipality, Lovech Province, northern Bulgaria.

References

Villages in Lovech Province